The voiceless palatal plosive or stop is a type of consonantal sound used in some vocal languages.

The equivalent X-SAMPA symbols are c_+ and t_-' or t_-_j, respectively. There is also a non-IPA letter  ("t", plus the curl found in the symbols for alveolo-palatal sibilant fricatives ), used especially in sinological circles.

It is common for the phonetic symbol  to be used to represent voiceless postalveolar affricate  or other similar affricates, for example in the Indic languages. This may be considered appropriate when the place of articulation needs to be specified and the distinction between plosive and affricate is not contrastive.

There is also the voiceless post-palatal plosive in some languages, which is articulated slightly more back compared with the place of articulation of the prototypical palatal consonant, though not as back as the prototypical velar consonant. The equivalent X-SAMPA symbols are c_- and k_+, respectively.

Especially in broad transcription, the voiceless post-palatal plosive may be transcribed as a palatalized voiceless velar plosive ( in the IPA, k' or k_j in X-SAMPA).

Features

Features of the voiceless palatal stop:

 
 The otherwise identical post-palatal variant is articulated slightly behind the hard palate, making it sound closer to the velar .
 Alveolo-palatal variant is articulated also with the blade of the tongue at or behind the alveolar ridge.

Occurrence

Palatal or alveolo-palatal

Post-palatal

See also
 Index of phonetics articles

Notes

References

External links
 

Palatal consonants
Voiceless stops
Central consonants
Pulmonic consonants